Max Balchowsky (January 15, 1924 - August 30, 1998) was a prominent 1950s and 1960s American race car builder and driver, and was involved in the film industry as a stuntman and an automotive mechanic. He is remembered for his crude but spectator-popular underdog Old Yeller Specials that competed against many of Europe's most exotic and expensive sports cars.

Early life 
Max Balchowsky was born and raised in Fairmont, West Virginia.  His early training in mechanical engineering came when he worked in watch repair and bicycle shops at a young age. He served in World War II as a B-24 belly turret gunner in the European campaign and following injuries incurred while bailing out, served in the Burma campaign.

After the war he moved to Southern California where he worked in his brother Caspar's garage and became involved in street hot rod and drag racing.

In 1949 he married Ina Wilson and they opened Hollywood Motors at 4905 Hollywood Blvd in Hollywood, California.  The business catered to auto enthusiasts with Balchowsky specializing in replacing European engines with more powerful American V-8s, predominantly Buick and Cadillac engines. Several of his engine swaps were illustrated in Hot Rod magazine at the time. Ina was an active part of Hollywood Motors and in the racing they participated in. She not only took care of the business part of the business, but also welded, fabricated, tuned engines, and set up their race cars for the track.

Racing 
Balchowsky competed in street, drag and most notably in California Sports Car Club (Cal Club) and Sports Club Car of America (SCCA) races.  From 1951 to 1960 he entered 64 SCCA and USAC races, with 38 finishes, 5 wins, 9 class wins and 18 podium finishes.

In 1952 he bought a 1932 Ford roadster hot rod with a LaSalle engine.  He drag raced it and raced it in sports car races which was unusual at the time.  After  changing the engine to a Buick V-8 he found success.  He nicknamed it Bu-Ford Special.

Between 1954 and 1955 he purchased six or seven Doretti Swallow sports cars, swapping their 2 litre Triumph engines for Buicks, Cadillac and Chevrolet engines, and replacing their transmissions with Jaguar and Ford transmissions. Most were sold to customers and Balchowsky kept one for himself which he called the Buretti Special.  He drag and sports car raced it. He raced his Buretti often in 1955 and 1956 and in a couple of races in 1957.

From 1955 to 1960 Balchowsky raced his famed Old Yeller/Ol' Yaller cars with much success.  He won two 1957 SCCA National Sports Car Championship races out of fifteen in his group (BM). When Balchowsky wasn't driving his cars, some of the best drivers of the day took the helm, including, Dan Gurney, Carroll Shelby, Bob Bondurant, Billy Krause, Bob Drake, Paul O'Shea, and Ronnie Bucknum.

In 1965 Balchowsky was a mechanic for the two Bizzarrini Iso Grifo cars powered by Chevrolet 327s for the Sebring 12 Hour Grand Prix of Endurance. Unfortunately both cars crashed. Balchowsky took the wrecked cars back to his shop, started building a car using parts from the two totaled cars but the result has never surfaced.

In 1966 car owner Chuck Jones brought driver Skip Hudson and Balchowsky together to campaign his Lola T70 Spyder in the United States Road Racing Championship series. According to Jones, they placed either 2nd or 3rd overall by season's end with a 3rd at Road America 500 miles.

Old Yeller and Ol' Yaller Race Cars 
Balchowsky designed and built nine Old Yeller/Ol' Yaller cars. His first two were named Old Yeller after the dog in Disney's 1957 film who was yellow, mangy and unwanted. Disney didn't like that so Balchowsky changed the spelling of his cars to "Ol' Yaller." The first two were crudely built and parts were sourced from junkyards but they proved very competitive with the high torque Buick V8 nailhead engine. Cinematographer Haskell Wexler financed/sponsored many of the cars. He remarked that, "I never kept track of which Old Yellers were really mine or not. I paid for the right to be the owner and to be around Max and to be around the cars and to drive the car on the streets."

Film Work 
Balchowsky was involved in the production of many films working as a mechanic to modify, repair, and maintain the cars, as a consultant, and as a stunt driver. He is noted for preparing the Mustangs and Dodges used in the film Bullitt which had one of Hollywood's most iconic car chase scenes.

Legacy 
 Old Yeller I was included in Hot Rod's 2008 "Top 100 Hot Rods That Changed the World" list at #95.
 Dr. Ernie Nagamatsu has been an enthusiastic ambassador for Old Yeller II and Max and Ina Balchowsky while heritage racing at home and internationally. He has:
Raced at the Goodwood Festival of Speed and the Goodwood Revival Meeting more than twelve times
Raced at Silverstone Classic, Chateau Impney Hill Climb, and the Rod Millen Leadfoot Festival Hill Climb in 2017
Won the Rolex Phil Hill Monterey Cup in 2005
Received the first Bruce McLaren Perpetual Trophy at the New Zealand Festival of Motor Racing
Received the Rolex Australian F1 Grand Prix Historic Race "Winner" Trophy
Raced Old Yeller II in many of the national heritage events such as Road America, Coronado Speed Festival and Monterey
Shown Old Yeller II at Amelia Island Concours d'Elegance and Pebble Beach Concours d'Elegance where he won awards
 Ol' Yaller VIII sold for $198,000 at the Las Vegas Barrett-Jackson Auction in 2009,
 Ol' Yallers III and IX are part of the Petersen Automotive Museum collection in Los Angeles, California.
 The Steve McQueen 1968 Bullitt movie Mustang with Balchowsky modified engine and suspension is in the National Historic Vehicle Register.
 Max Balchowsky and his 1963 Ol' Yaller IX was one of 12 cars and builders featured in The Petersen Automotive Museum exhibit, "Legends of Los Angeles and Southern California Race Cars and Their Builders" which ran from November 10, 2018 through December 1, 2019.
Jay Leno in May 2021 released a Jay Leno's Garage episode showcasing Max Balchowsky's 1959 Old Yeller II and the car's owner and driver, Ernie Nagamatsu.

References

External links 
  
Old Yeller II

1998 deaths
1924 births
Racing drivers from California
Sportspeople from Fairmont, West Virginia
Racing drivers from West Virginia
American military personnel of World War II
Military personnel from West Virginia